The Ti-Sarana Buddhist Association is a Buddhist organisation for the English speaking Buddhist Community in Singapore. The President of the group as of 2014 is Khemaka David Chew. Notable resident monks include Venerables Pategama Gnanarama Mahāthera, Welipitiye Ratanasiri Mahāthera and Ridiyagama Ānanda Thera.

Overview

Ti-Sarana Buddhist Association was founded in 1976 with its original premises located at 85-A Marine Parade where its first Shrine Hall was inaugurated on 1 April 1978, during which the Sunday Dhamma School formally began. By 1980 the organization relocated at 90 Duku Road which serves as their primary venue till today. The building was redeveloped and extended between 1988 and 2001 before being officially opened on 22 April 2001 by Venerable Bellana Sri Gnanawimala Mahā Nāyakathera.

Structure
The Ti-Sarana Buddhist Association comes with the following appointments:

References

Buddhist organisations based in Singapore